Ali Brice is a UK-based alternative comedian, character comedian and actor who regularly performs at the Edinburgh Fringe Festival. He has toured internationally as a stage actor and regularly features in high profile television commercials.

Career 
Brice began performing comedy in 2010 and is a regular performer at some of the most prestigious alternative comedy clubs in the UK, including ACMS and Weirdos. He took his first show, Eric Meat Wants to Go Shopping, to the Edinburgh Fringe in 2014 to rave reviews, with Chortle calling him 'joyously bonkers'. That same year Time Out named him as one of their 'ones to watch' in a list of character comedians.

In 2015, he took his second show, Eric Meat Has No Proof Only Memories of Pasta, to the Edinburgh Fringe and Fest Mag interviewed him as a prominent figure of alternative comedy with a DIY ethic. That same year Brice took on the title role of Graeme in Graeme of Thrones - a parody of Game of Thrones -  which debuted at the Leicester Square Theatre and was reviewed positively by The Times before touring the UK, Australia and North America

He has been to the fringe each year since 2014, most recently with Bin Wondering a "tale of him tackling alcoholism...his larks about crocodiles and Jimmy Nail and bins" which was filmed by NextUp Comedy at The Bill Murray in late 2019. It was at this show that Brice was spotted by Glorious Management, a talent agency, who subsequently invited him to join their roster, which includes acts such as Nick Helm and Stephen K. Amos.

In 2018, he appeared in Spencer Jones' The Mind of Herbert Clunkerdunk and starred in his first advert, promoting J2O in their 'Find Your Mojo' campaign. Other TV commercials Brice has appeared in include Pokerstars, Ladbrokes and HELLA

In 2020, he co-starred in Lad Pad with Joz Norris, with whom he co-wrote the series.

References

External links 

 
 Ali Brice website

British comedians
British actors
Living people
Year of birth missing (living people)